Diversified Technology, Inc. was a computer hardware manufacturing company. Based in Ridgeland, Mississippi, the company, which was a subsidiary of Ergon, Inc., was formed in 1971. In 1987, Diversified Technology released the first IBM-compatible single-board computer for a passive ISA backplane. Diversified was also the first to introduce an ATCA- and InfiniBand-based blade network switch, introduced in Intel Xeon and AMD Opteron variants in 2005 and 2007 respectively.

Diversified Technology ceased operations in 2013.

External links

References

1971 establishments in Mississippi
2013 disestablishments in Mississippi
American companies established in 1971
American companies disestablished in 2013
Companies based in Mississippi
Computer companies established in 1971
Computer companies disestablished in 2013
Defunct computer companies of the United States